Laura Almerich Santacreu (3 July 1940 – 14 June 2019) was a classical Spanish guitarist from Barcelona. She is remembered in particular for accompanying the successful Catalan-language singer Lluís Llach since he embarked on his career in the late 1960s. As a result, she was closely associated with the Catalan Nova Cançó movement. Llach dedicated two songs to her: "Laura" (1977) and "Roses blanques" (White Roses, 1994).

Biography
Born on 3 July 1940 in Barcelona, Almerich studied piano at the Barcelona Conservatory before concentrating on the guitar under Renata Tarragó.

It was Tarragó who introduced her to Nova Cançó as the second guitar on Maria del Mar Bonet's first record in 1967. From 1969, she became the constant companion and confidant of Lluís Llach, accompanying him on the guitar throughout his career. When for political reasons, Llach had to perform outside of Spain, he always used his initial savings to have Almerich come and join him. She did not normally expect to be paid for her services, only for the cost of the trip.

At the end of a concert in 1977, he surprised her by dedicating "Laura" to her. It has become one of the Catalans' most beloved songs. The two sang it together during their concert at Camp Nou in 1985. Almerich was so overcome by emotion that she was unable to complete her solo, breaking down in tears. In 1994, Llach dedicated a second song to her "Roses blanques".

Laura Almerich died in Barcelona on 14 June 2019 after a long illness.

References

1940 births
2019 deaths
Musicians from Barcelona
Spanish classical guitarists
Spanish women guitarists
20th-century women guitarists
21st-century women guitarists
Women classical guitarists
20th-century classical musicians
21st-century classical musicians
20th-century Spanish musicians
21st-century Spanish musicians